The 2005 Mountain West Conference football season was the 7th since eight former members of the Western Athletic Conference banded together to form the MW. Texas Christian University was added as the conference's 9th member in 2005, and won the conference championship in their first season since moving over from Conference USA.

Coaching changes
Bronco Mendenhall took over at BYU, replacing Gary Crowton.
Mike Sanford took over at UNLV, replacing John Robinson.
Kyle Whittingham took over at Utah, replacing Urban Meyer.

Bowl games

Awards
Coach of the Year: Gary Patterson, TCU
Offensive Player of the Year: RB DonTrell Moore, Sr, New Mexico
Defensive Player of the Year: DB Eric Weddle, Jr, Utah
Freshman of the Year: RB Aaron Brown, TCU

All Conference Team